The 2020–21 season is Carlisle United's 116th season in their history and the seventh consecutive season in EFL League Two, Along with League Two, the club will also participate in the FA Cup, EFL Cup, and EFL Trophy.

The season covers the period from 1 July 2020 to 30 June 2021.

Squad statistics

Top scorers

Disciplinary record

Notes:

Pre-season

Competitions

EFL League Two

League table

Results summary

Results by matchday

Matches

The 2020–21 season fixtures were released on 21 August.

 
 

 

Notes

FA Cup

The draw for the first round was made on Monday 26, October. The second round draw was revealed on Monday, 9 November by Danny Cowley.

EFL Cup

The first round draw was made on 18 August, live on Sky Sports, by Paul Merson.

EFL Trophy

The regional group stage draw was confirmed on 18 August.

Transfers

Transfers in

Loans in

Loans out

Transfers out

References

Notes

Carlisle United
Carlisle United F.C. seasons